Holotrichius is a genus of assassin bugs.

Species
The genus includes the following species:

 Holotrichius apterus Jakovlev, 1879
 Holotrichius bergrothi
 Holotrichius bodenhiemeri Dispons, 1962
 Holotrichius denudatus A. Costa, 1842
 Holotrichius innesi Horvath, 1910
 Holotrichius luctuosus Mulsant & Mayet, 1868
 Holotrichius obtusangulus
 Holotrichius putoni Reuter, 1909
 Holotrichius reuterianus Dispons, 1961
 Holotrichius rotundatus Stål, 1874
 Holotrichius squalidus Douglas & Scott, 1868
 Holotrichius tenebrosus Burmeister, 1835

References

Reduviidae
Cimicomorpha genera